The Korloff Noir is one of the world's largest known black diamonds.  It is an 88-carat diamond, with 57 edges.  Before it was cut and polished, it had 421 carats.  It is named for the Korloff -Sapojnikoff family, members of the Russian nobility, who once owned it.  In 1978, Daniel Paillasseur, a French jeweller, purchased it.  The Korloff Noir is currently owned by the Korloff Company, which was founded by Paillasseur.  It is insured for $37 million.

See also
 Spirit of de Grisogono Diamond, the world's largest cut black diamond
 Amsterdam Diamond, another famous cut black diamond
 List of diamonds

References

Individual diamonds
Black diamonds